Francesco Vicentino (active 16th century) was an Italian painter of the Renaissance period. He was born in Milan, and became a pupil of Cesare Bernazano. He painted for Santa Maria delle Grazie at Milan, and other churches.

References

Painters from Milan
16th-century Italian painters
Italian male painters
Italian Renaissance painters
Year of death unknown
Year of birth unknown